Favour Chukwuka Ofili (born 31 December 2002) is a Nigerian track and field sprinter. She is the 2019 African Games silver medallist in the 400 metres. Ofili won silver for the 200 metres at the 2022 Commonwealth Games.

She was the 2021 World Under-20 Championship bronze medallist in the 200 m. Ofili is the African indoor record holder in the event and holds Nigerian record (also at U20 level) over the distance with a time of 21.96 seconds, making her the first Nigerian woman in history (and second African woman) to break the 22-second barrier. She also ran 10.93 seconds in the 100 m in April 2022, becoming the first female NCAA athlete to run sub 11s and sub 22s.

Career
Favour Ofili was named the female athlete of the meet at the 2019 African Under-18 Championships after winning the 200 and 400 metres with new personal bests in both. Still 16, she represented her country at the World Relays in Yokohama a month later, running in the 4 × 100 m and 4 × 400 m relays. She won the 200 m and finished second behind Patience George in the 400 m at the Nigerian Championships in July, running under 52 seconds at the longer event for the first time. Ofili bettered this mark at the African Games a month later, finishing second with 51.68 s and qualifying for the World Athletics Championships in Doha. She also anchored the Nigerian team (Kemi Francis, Patience George and Blessing Oladoye) to a gold medal in the women's 4 x 400 m relay at the Games. This secured a second senior medal for the young athlete. As the youngest athlete at the World Championships in September, she improved her 400 m personal best to 51.51 s but was eliminated in the semi-finals.

Ofili earned a scholarship at the Louisiana State University. On 27 February 2021, she set an African indoor record in the 200 m with a time of 22.75 s at the SEC Indoor Championship in Fayetteville, Arkansas. She won bronze in the 200 m and two medals for relays at the World U20 Championships in Nairobi, with her mark in her individual event being the third-fastest ever by a U20 woman.

In February 2022, Ofili bettered her African indoor 200 m record three times, improving it ultimately to 22.46 s. She held the NCAA collegiate record in the outdoor event with her time of 21.96 s set on 15 April that year, until Abby Steiner broke the record two months later. Ofili's mark set at the Tom Jones Memorial Invitational in Gainesville, Florida surpassed 14-year-old Blessing Okagbare's Nigerian record and was also an African record at the time.

She became also the second-fastest indoor 200 m runner in collegiate history (after Steiner) in February 2023, setting even better African indoor record of 22.36 s at the Tyson Invitational in Fayetteville, Arkansas.

Achievements

International competitions

National titles
 200 meters: 2019
 4 × 400 m relay: 2021
 4 × 400 m mixed: 2021

Personal bests
 60 metres indoor – 7.15 (Fayetteville, AR 2023)
 100 metres – 10.93 (+2.0 m/s, Baton Rouge, LA 2022)
 200 metres – 21.96 (+1.3 m/s, Gainesville, FL 2022) 
 200 metres U20 – 22.23 (+1.1 m/s, Nairobi 2021) 
 200 metres indoor – 22.11 (Albuquerque, NM 2023) 
 400 metres – 51.49 (Baton Rouge, LA 2021)

References

External links
 

2002 births
Living people
African Games gold medalists for Nigeria
African Games silver medalists for Nigeria
African Games medalists in athletics (track and field)
Athletes (track and field) at the 2019 African Games
Athletes (track and field) at the 2018 Summer Youth Olympics
Athletes (track and field) at the 2018 African Youth Games
Nigerian female sprinters
LSU Lady Tigers track and field athletes
Sportspeople from Port Harcourt
University of Port Harcourt alumni
21st-century Nigerian women
Commonwealth Games medallists in athletics
Commonwealth Games bronze medallists for Nigeria
Commonwealth Games gold medallists for Nigeria
Athletes (track and field) at the 2022 Commonwealth Games
Medallists at the 2022 Commonwealth Games